Rybniště is a municipality and village in Děčín District in the Ústí nad Labem Region of the Czech Republic. It has about 700 inhabitants.

Administrative parts
The village of Nová Chřibská is an administrative part of Rybniště.

Geography
It lies on the border between the Lusatian Mountains and Lusatian Highlands. A significant body of water is Velký Pond in the northern part of the territory.

History
The village of Nová Chřibská under the name Chřibská Nová Ves was first mentioned in 1475. It belonged to the Tolštejn estate until 1573, then it was bought by the Wartenberg family and annexed to the Česká Kamenice estate. The first written mention of Rybniště is from 1715, when it is described as a settlement formed on the site of a drained and dried pond. The two villages were administratively merged in 1805 under the name Rybniště.

Sights
The landmark of Rybniště is the Church of Saint Joseph. It was built in 1911–1912 and belongs to the yougest churches in the region. It is one of the few Art Nouveau churches in the country.

References

External links

Villages in Děčín District